​Holden Sheppard (born June 26, 1988) is a multi award-winning author from Geraldton, Western Australia. His debut young adult (YA) novel, Invisible Boys, won multiple accolades including the 2018 T.A.G. Hungerford Award and the 2019 Western Australian Premier's Book Award. His writing often focuses on themes of masculinity, sexuality and mental health.

Early life
Sheppard was born in the country town of Geraldton in Western Australia. At the age of 18, he moved to Perth and studied a bachelors of English literature at Edith Cowan University.

Career

Sheppard's debut YA novel, Invisible Boys, follows three gay teenage boys rural Western Australia after one of them is outed. It was published by Fremantle Press in 2019 after Sheppard won the T.A.G. Hungerford Award in 2018 and received a cash prize and publishing contract. In 2019, he won the Western Australian Premier's Book Award for an Emerging Writer and received $15,000 in prize money. The following year, the book was shortlisted for the Victorian Premier's Literary Awards and named a Notable Book by the Children's Book Council of Australia. It is currently in development as a 10-episode TV series as part of a Screenwest and Stan development initiative.

His second book, YA thriller The Brink, was published by Text Publishing in 2022 and is currently shortlisted for the 2023 Indie Book Awards. The book follows a group of school leavers on a remote island off the coast of Western Australia, where they discover a dead body.

Sheppard's writing has been published in several literary magazines including Griffith Review, Westerly, page seventeen and Indigo Journal. His work has also appeared in anthologies Bright Lights, No City (2018), Hometown Haunts: #LoveOzYA Horror Tales (2021) and Growing Up in Country Australia (2022).

Personal life
Sheppard is openly gay and is married to husband Raphael Farmer. He is also a part-time labourer.

Bibliography

Television

Accolades

References

External links 

21st-century Australian novelists
Australian male novelists
Writers from Perth, Western Australia
Australian LGBT novelists
Gay novelists
Living people
21st-century male writers
Year of birth missing (living people)